The University of Massachusetts Amherst Elaine N. Marieb College of Nursing is a nursing college at the University of Massachusetts Amherst.

History 
In 2021, the Elaine N. Marieb Foundation donated $21.5 million to the UMass Amherst, the university's largest to date. As a result, the college was named after her.

Degree programs

Undergraduate 
 Bachelor of Science in Nursing

Graduate 
 Master of Science in Nursing - Clinical Nurse Leader Online
 Doctor of Nursing Practice (DNP) Online
 Family Nurse Practitioner (FNP) 
 Public Health Nurse Leader (PHNL)
 Adult Gerontology Primary Care Nurse Practitioner (AGPCNP)
 Post Master's DNP Completion.
 Doctor of Philosophy (Ph.D.) in Nursing

References

External links 
 College of Nursing official site

Nursing schools in Massachusetts
University of Massachusetts Amherst schools
University subdivisions in Massachusetts